Piedmont Virginia Community College (PVCC) is a public community college in Charlottesville, Virginia.  It offers associate degrees, one-year certificates, continuing education, and workforce training. The campus is located in Albemarle County, Virginia, south of Charlottesville.  As part of the statewide Virginia Community College System, PVCC serves the City of Charlottesville and the counties of Albemarle, Buckingham, Fluvanna, Greene, Louisa and Nelson. PVCC was chartered in 1972.   
PVCC has been accredited since 1974 by the Commission on Colleges of the Southern Association of Colleges and Schools to award associate degrees.

Locations

PVCC's main campus is located at 501 College Drive in Charlottesville, Virginia. It consists of the Main Building, the V. Earl Dickinson Building for Humanities and Social Sciences, the Keats Science Building, and the Stultz Center for Business and Career Development.

PVCC opened a center in Stanardsville, Virginia, in August 2012. The PVCC Eugene Giuseppe Center occupies the second floor of the Greene County Library building and holds classrooms, labs, a community meeting room and other facilities. The College began offering classes there in fall 2012.

PVCC also opened a center in downtown Charlottesville, Virginia, in January 2013. PVCC is housed on the ground floor in the historic Jefferson School building. The college offers day and evening classes at this facility and introduced a new associate degree program in culinary arts hosted there since 2013.

Student body
In 2020, PVCC consists of a total of 5,684 undergraduates, 79% of which are part-time students.

A PVCC student has been named the top community college student in Virginia in 2013, 2010, 2008, 2007, 2004 and 2001.

Academics

PVCC offers degrees and certificates to complete in two years or less, as well as degrees that prepare students for transfer to four-year schools to complete a bachelor's degree. Associate degrees generally take two years of full-time study to complete and require 60-72 credit hours. Certificates and Career Studies Certificates require 9-46 credit hours and one or two semesters to complete.

References

External links
 Official website

Virginia Community College System
Universities and colleges accredited by the Southern Association of Colleges and Schools
Education in Albemarle County, Virginia
Educational institutions established in 1972
1972 establishments in Virginia